Roger Hamelin (April 27, 1941 - November 25, 2018) was a Canadian football player who played for the Winnipeg Blue Bombers. He won the Grey Cup with them in 1961 and 1962. He is a member of the Football Manitoba Hall of Fame, inducted 2013. He died on November 25, 2018.

References

1941 births
2018 deaths
Canadian football people from Winnipeg
Players of Canadian football from Manitoba
Winnipeg Blue Bombers players